Final Horizon is a tower defense video game developed and published by British independent studio Eiconic Games for PlayStation 4 and PlayStation Vita and distributed through PlayStation Network. It was released on December 4, 2014 in North America and December 5, 2014 in Europe and Australia. A downloadable add-on pack titled Dark Galaxy was released alongside the game.

Reception
Final Horizon has received generally positive reviews. The Vita version currently has a rating of 80% on GameRankings.

References

2014 video games
Tower defense video games
PlayStation 4 games
PlayStation Vita games
Video games developed in the United Kingdom